Mount Oso is a high and prominent mountain summit in the San Juan Mountains range of the Rocky Mountains of North America.

Mountain

Historical names
Hunchback
Mount Oso – 1906

See also

List of mountain peaks of North America
List of mountain peaks of the United States
List of mountain peaks of Colorado

References

External links

San Juan Mountains (Colorado)
Oso
San Juan National Forest
Oso
Oso